Tiberia apicifusca is a species of minute sea snail, a marine gastropod mollusk in the family Pyramidellidae, the pyrams and their allies.

Description
The length of shell varies between 4.5 mm and 5 mm.

Distribution
This species occurs in the following locations:
 Cape Verdes at depths between 273 m and 970 m.

References

External links
 To Encyclopedia of Life
 

Pyramidellidae
Gastropods described in 1998
Gastropods of Cape Verde